Chendar District is in Savojbolagh County, Alborz province, Iran. At the 2006 census, its population was 21,291 in 6,130 households, when the county was within Tehran province. At the latest census in 2016, the population had increased to 28,841 in 9,499 households, by which time the county was within Alborz province.

References 

Savojbolagh County

Districts of Alborz Province

Populated places in Alborz Province

Populated places in Savojbolagh County